Scott Schutt was a player in the National Football League for the Cincinnati Bengals in 1987. During his brief NFL career as a linebacker, Schutt played in three games and scored two points on a safety.  He played at the collegiate level at North Dakota State University.

Biography
Schutt was born Scott Joseph Schutt on August 31, 1963 in Prairie du Sac, Wisconsin.
Schutt then was a math teacher at Sauk Prairie High School.

References

Living people
1963 births
Cincinnati Bengals players
People from Prairie du Sac, Wisconsin
Players of American football from Wisconsin
National Football League replacement players